There Were Thirteen (Spanish: Eran trece) is  a 1931 American Pre-Code mystery film directed by David Howard and starring Juan Torena, Ana María Custodio, and Rafael Calvo, with Manuel Arbó as Charlie Chan.

It is a Spanish-language version of the 1931 Hollywood film Charlie Chan Carries On, with a separate cast and several plot alterations. Like the English original, which has been lost, it was based on the 1930 novel Charlie Chan Carries On by Earl Derr Biggers.

Cast
 Juan Torena as Dick Kennaway 
 Ana María Custodio as Elen Potter  
 Rafael Calvo as Inspector Duff  
 Raul Roulien as Max Minchin  
 Blanca de Castejón as Peggy Minchin  
 Miguel Ligero as Frank Benbow  
 Amelia Santee as Señora Benbow  
 Carmen Rodríguez as Señora Rockwel  
 Julio Villarreal as Dr. Lofton 
 José Nieto as Capitán Kin  
 Carlos Díaz de Mendoza as Walter Decker  
 Lia Torá as Sybil Conway  
 Martin Garralaga as John Ross  
 Antonio Vidal as Paul Nielson  
 Ralph Navarro as Inspector Gardner  
 Manuel Arbó as Charlie Chan

References

Bibliography
 Jarvinen, Lisa. The Rise of Spanish-language Filmmaking: Out from Hollywood's Shadow, 1929-1939. Rutger's University Press, 2012.

External links
 

1931 films
1931 mystery films
1930s Spanish-language films
Spanish-language American films
American mystery films
Films directed by David Howard
20th Century Fox films
American black-and-white films
Charlie Chan films
Films set in London
Films based on American novels
Films based on mystery novels
American multilingual films
1931 multilingual films
1930s American films